Indian Airlines Flight 423 (IATA No.: IC423) was an Indian Airlines Boeing 737 domestic passenger flight from the Delhi-Palam Airport to the Amritsar-Raja Sansi Airport on 29 September 1981. It was hijacked by five Sikh of the Dal Khalsa, masterminded by Sikh and taken to Lahore Airport in Pakistan. The plane had 111 passengers and 6 crew members on board. The Dal Khalsa had been demanding a separate Sikh homeland of Khalistan.

The leader of the hijackers, Gajender Singh, talked to Natwar Singh, India's ambassador in Pakistan, and put forward his demands. Singh had demanded the release of Jarnail Singh Bhindranwale and others, and a sum of $500,000 in cash.

Pakistan rescued the passengers upon request from India in spite of protests by Pakistani intelligence agency ISI. Pakistan took commando action using its elite SSG which cleared the plane and got all passengers released. The hijackers faced trial in Pakistan and they were sentenced to life imprisonment.

The accused, Satnam Singh, after completing his trial, returned to India and was put on retrial. However the court discharged him, stating that the accused has already served the sentence in Pakistan.

See also 

 List of hijackings of Indian aeroplanes#1980s
 List of aircraft hijackings#1980s
 List of accidents and incidents involving airliners by location#India
 List of accidents and incidents involving airliners by airline (D–O)#I
 List of accidents and incidents involving commercial aircraft#1981

References

External link 

 

Aviation accidents and incidents in 1981
Aircraft hijackings in Pakistan
Aircraft hijackings in India
Aviation accidents and incidents in India
Sikh terrorism in India
Terrorist incidents in India in 1981
Hostage taking
423
1981 in India
Accidents and incidents involving the Boeing 737 Original
Indira Gandhi administration
Aircraft hijackings
Terrorist incidents in India
1981 in Pakistan
India–Pakistan relations